Haaksbergen is a municipality and a town in the eastern Netherlands, in the province of Overijssel, in the Twente region.

The Buurserbeek flows through the municipality of Haaksbergen.

Population centres

Topography

Dutch Topographic map of Haaksbergen (town), June 2014.

Haaksbergen monstertruck accident

On 28 September 2014 a monster truck crashed into the attending crowd. Three visitors were reported dead, amongst them one child. According to Hans Gerritsen, mayor of Haaksbergen at the time, twelve people were injured.

Notable residents 

 Paul Ulenbelt (born 1952) a Dutch politician and former trade unionist and academic
 Angelien Eijsink (born 1960) a Dutch politician
 Han ten Broeke (born 1969) a Dutch politician
 Thomas Berge (born 1990) a Dutch singer

Sport 
 Andy Scharmin (1967–1989) a Surinamese-Dutch footballer
 Erik ten Hag (born 1970) former footballer with 336 club caps and current manager of Manchester United 
 Niki Leferink, (born 1976) retired footballer with 350 club caps
 Bram Tankink (born 1978) former cyclist
 Shirley van der Lof (born 1986) a racing driver

Gallery

References

External links

Official website

 
Municipalities of Overijssel
Populated places in Overijssel
Twente